The 2005 Super Cheap Auto 1000 was an endurance motor race for V8 Supercars. The race was held on 9 October 2005 at the Mount Panorama Circuit just outside Bathurst in New South Wales, Australia and was Round 10 of the 2005 V8 Supercar Championship Series. It was the ninth running of the Australia 1000 race, first held after the organisational split over the Bathurst 1000 that occurred in 1997. It was the 48th in a sequence of endurance races which commenced with the 1960 Armstrong 500 held at Phillip Island and 2005 was the 43rd year in which these races had been run at the Mount Panorama Circuit. It was also the first to be run under new naming rights sponsor, Australian automotive retail chain Super Cheap Auto.

The race was won by Mark Skaife and Todd Kelly of the Holden Racing Team. It was the seventh consecutive win by a Holden, the longest such streak in the combined history of the Bathurst 1000. It was the Holden Racing Team's fifth Bathurst victory and Skaife's fifth win as well. Kelly followed his younger brother Rick as a Bathurst winner, becoming the 50th driver to claim victory.

Skaife took the lead with 20 laps to go over the Tasman Motorsport Commodore of Jason Richards.

Greg Murphy and Marcos Ambrose came in contact at the Cutting with 16 laps to go. The two drivers argued heatedly after the collision.

Entry list

Qualifying

Qualifying

Top Ten Shootout
The fastest ten cars from Qualifying contested a single lap shootout to determine the first ten grid positions for the race.

Starting grid
The following table represents the final starting grid for the race on Sunday:

Race results

Statistics
 Provisional Pole – #888 Craig Lowndes – 2:07.1322
 Pole Position – #888 Craig Lowndes – 2:07.4221
 Fastest Lap – #2 Mark Skaife – 2:08.6515 (173.86 km/h) on lap 95 – new outright record
 Average Speed – 151 km/h

References

External links
 Official race results

Motorsport in Bathurst, New South Wales
Supercheap Auto 1000